Wheatfield may refer to:

Locations

 The Wheatfield, site of fierce fighting during the second day of the Battle of Gettysburg
 Wheatfield, Indiana, U.S.
 Wheatfield (Ellicott City, Maryland), U.S., a historic home
 Wheatfield, New York, U.S.
Niagara-Wheatfield Central School District
 Wheatfield, Oxfordshire, UK
 Wheatfield, Virginia, U.S.
 Wheatfield Fork Gualala River, a stream in the mountains of California

Other
 Wheatfield Jr. Blades, an American junior ice hockey team based in Wheatfield, New York
 Wheatfield Soul, an album released in 1968 by the Canadian rock band The Guess Who
 Wheatfield (band), an Americana group also known as St. Elmo's Fire

See also
 The Wheat Field, a group of paintings by Vincent Van Gogh of an enclosed wheat field in Saint-Rémy, France
 Wheat Fields (Van Gogh series), a series of paintings by Vincent Van Gogh over his career
 "Running through fields of wheat", a comment by Theresa May